Without a Trace is a 1983 American drama film directed by Stanley R. Jaffe and starring Kate Nelligan, Judd Hirsch, David Dukes and Stockard Channing. It is based on the novel Still Missing by Beth Gutcheon. The story is partly based on the disappearance of Etan Patz.

Plot
Susan Selky is a well-known English professor at Columbia University. She lives in a Brooklyn brownstone with her 6-year-old son Alex (Danny Corkill). One March morning, Susan sees Alex off to school, which is only two blocks away. Alex turns to wave to his mother, then disappears around the corner.

Susan returns home after work, and becomes increasingly alarmed when Alex is late. She calls her friend and neighbor Jocelyn Norris, whose daughter is a classmate of Alex's, and learns Alex never went to school. She immediately calls the New York City Police Department, and officers descend on the townhouse, led by Lieutenant Al Menetti. Susan is questioned closely on all aspects of her life and her son's, and the police initially suspect her estranged husband, Graham, a professor at New York University, but he produces an alibi.

Susan's case generates attention from the local media, and citizens help in the search by distributing posters. Susan is initially criticized for allowing her son to walk to school by himself. Susan takes a polygraph test that clears her as a suspect. Numerous leads are checked out, including several reports that Alex may have been seen in the back seat of a blue 1965 Chevy. A psychic is also called in, but each lead fizzles.

The investigation drags on, and Graham is at odds with Menetti after budget cuts force Menetti to dismantle the command center in Susan's apartment and run the case from the precinct. Menetti's attention is soon diverted to other cases, but the Selky case is always a priority. At one point, Graham takes matters into his own hands after he receives a ransom call. Given a beating, he requires a hospital stay.

A break in the case finally happens on the Fourth of July, when Susan's housecleaner, Philippe, is arrested as a suspect. A pair of Alex's bloody underpants was found in his apartment, where the gay Philippe was picked up with a 14-year-old male prostitute. Susan visits Philippe in jail, and he tells her that the bloody underpants came about when he used them to stop bleeding after he cut himself washing dishes in Susan's house. Convinced Philippe is innocent, Susan tries to persuade Menetti to drop the charges, but he refuses, citing undisclosed physical evidence.

The renewed media coverage generated by Philippe's arrest dies down, and Susan faces increased pressure to drop the matter and accept that Alex could be dead. Susan's feelings come to a boiling point when a magazine cancels an article she wrote about Alex, and Jocelyn advises her to give up. Susan tries to resume her normal routine, although she never loses faith. One day, she receives a phone call from a woman in Bridgeport, Connecticut, named Malvina Robbins, who says Alex is living with neighbors. Menetti tells Susan he has also heard from Robbins, but Bridgeport police told him the woman is a crank. The investigation is closed, he says, and Philippe goes on trial within weeks.

On a day off, Menetti takes a drive with his son. When he sees a sign for Bridgeport, Connecticut, he  checks out the lead personally. He recruits his young son as his partner on the case. Once he is sure that the lead is false, Menetti hopes to browbeat Robbins from disturbing Selky. When Menetti arrives at Robbins' address, he is shocked to see a blue Chevy (in which witnesses had reported seeing Alex) parked in the driveway of the neighboring house. Realizing that Robbins was telling the truth, he uses her phone to contact the Bridgeport police. They find Alex alive and unharmed. His kidnapper wanted the boy to care for his disabled sister who lives in the house.

Menetti drives Alex back to New York with a huge police escort (which grows with each jurisdiction it passes through), and the New York media is tipped off that he has been found, converging on Susan's Brooklyn house. Susan returns from grocery shopping in time to see Alex stepping out of Menetti's car. In front of delighted bystanders and reporters, mother and child are reunited.

Cast
 Kate Nelligan as Susan Selky
 Judd Hirsch as Al Menetti
 David Dukes as Graham Selky
 Stockard Channing as Jocelyn Norris
 Danny Corkill as Alex Selky
 Louise Stubbs as Malvina Robbins
 Keith McDermott as Philippe
 David Simon as Menetti's son

Production
The film's screenplay was written by novelist and screenwriter Beth Gutcheon, who kept the film relatively faithful to her novel Still Missing, a work of fiction.  The one glaring difference between the book and the film is that the book was set in Boston, while the film was set and filmed in New York.  The film was originally supposed to be titled Still Missing, but was changed by the studio to avoid confusion with the 1982 film Missing.

Release
The film was released in North America on February 4, 1983, and grossed $9.6 million.

Reception
Janet Maslin of The New York Times called it "a reasonably well-made film" on its own terms but said it "deserves more thoughtful and imaginative treatment".

References

External links
 
 
 

1983 films
1980s mystery drama films
1983 LGBT-related films
American mystery drama films
Films scored by Jack Nitzsche
Films about missing people
Films based on American novels
20th Century Fox films
1983 drama films
American LGBT-related films
1980s English-language films
1980s American films